Linda Smith is a former Hong Kong international lawn bowler.

Bowls career
Smith has represented Hong Kong at the Commonwealth Games, in the pairs event at the 1994 Commonwealth Games.

She won a triples gold medal at the 1991 Asia Pacific Bowls Championships in Kowloon.

References

Hong Kong female bowls players
Living people
Date of birth missing (living people)
Year of birth missing (living people)
Bowls players at the 1994 Commonwealth Games